Antaeotricha osseella is a moth of the family Depressariidae. It is found in North America, where it has been recorded from New York, New Jersey, North Carolina, South Carolina, West Virginia, Maryland, District of Columbia, Massachusetts, Pennsylvania, Illinois, Arkansas, Missouri, Texas and California.

The wingspan is about 16–18 mm.

The larvae feed on Quercus alba and Quercus muehlenbergii.

References

Moths described in 1889
osseella
Moths of North America